In mathematics invariant theory, the bracket ring is the subring of the ring of polynomials k[x11,...,xdn] generated by the d-by-d minors of a generic d-by-n matrix (xij).

The bracket ring may be regarded as the ring of polynomials on the image of a Grassmannian under the Plücker embedding.

For given d ≤ n we define as formal variables the brackets [λ1 λ2 ... λd] with the λ taken from {1,...,n}, subject to [λ1 λ2 ... λd] = − [λ2 λ1 ... λd] and similarly for other transpositions.  The set Λ(n,d) of size  generates a polynomial ring K[Λ(n,d)] over a field K.  There is a homomorphism Φ(n,d) from K[Λ(n,d)] to the polynomial ring K[xi,j] in nd indeterminates given by mapping 
[λ1 λ2 ... λd] to the determinant of the d by d matrix consisting of the columns of the xi,j indexed by the λ.  The bracket ring B(n,d) is the image of Φ.  The kernel I(n,d) of Φ encodes the relations or syzygies that exist between the minors of a generic n by d matrix.  The projective variety defined by the ideal I is the (n−d)d dimensional Grassmann variety whose points correspond to d-dimensional subspaces of an n-dimensional space.

To compute with brackets it is necessary to determine when an expression lies in the ideal I(n,d).  This is achieved by a straightening law due to Young (1928).

See also
 Bracket algebra

References

Invariant theory
Algebraic geometry